Olga Kostenko (born December 26, 1984) is a Russian sprint canoer who has competed since the mid-2000s. At the 2004 Summer Olympics in Athens, she was eliminated in the semifinals of the K-1 500 m event.

References
Sports-Reference.com profile

1984 births
Canoeists at the 2004 Summer Olympics
Living people
Olympic canoeists of Russia
Russian female canoeists
Place of birth missing (living people)
21st-century Russian women